Kuzucubelen is a village in Mersin Province, Turkey. It is a part of Mezitli district which is an intracity district of Greater Mersin. It is situated in the Toros Mountains. The population was 568 as of 2019. Kuzucubelen residents are of Turkmen origin and they are known as Tahtaci. The village mostly consists of "Alevi"s, which is a spiritualistic belief of Islam. Main economic activity is business of timber.

Near the town is a two-storey watchtower with a stone vaulted lower-level and three impressive embrasures.  The masonry and design indicate that it was built in the 12th or 13th century during the period of the Armenian Kingdom of Cilicia. The fortification was surveyed in 1981.  Located between Tece Castle and Başnalar this site guarded a route from the Mediterranean Sea to Cappadocia.

References

Villages in Mezitli District